The President's Scout or President's Award may refer to several ranks in Scout organizations around the world:

the highest rank of Bangladesh Scouts
the highest rank of The Scout Association of Maldives
the highest rank of the Sri Lanka Scout Association
the highest rank of the Tanzania Scouts Association
the President's Award, the highest rank of the Kiribati Scout Association
President's Scout (Singapore Scout Association), the highest rank in the Singapore Scout Association
Rashtrapati Scout, the highest rank of The Bharat Scouts and Guides

Scout and Guide awards